The 2017–18 New Orleans Pelicans season was the 16th season of the New Orleans Pelicans franchise in the National Basketball Association (NBA). The Pelicans were coached by Alvin Gentry in his third year as head coach. They played their home games at the Smoothie King Center as members of the Western Conference's Southwest Division.

The team's second-leading scorer, DeMarcus Cousins, suffered a season-ending Achilles tendon injury during his subsequent final game as a Pelican on January 26, 2018, and missed the remainder of the season. Despite losing Cousins, the Pelicans clinched their first playoff berth since 2015 with a win over the Los Angeles Clippers on April 9, 2018. They finished the season 48–34 to finish in second place in the Southwest Division.

In the Playoffs, the Pelicans faced off against the third-seeded Portland Trail Blazers in the First Round. On April 14, 2018, the Pelicans won the first game in the First Round playoff series which marked the franchise's first playoff game win since the 2011 playoffs' First Round series against the Los Angeles Lakers. On April 21, the Pelicans completed the playoff series sweep over the Trail Blazers, marking the franchise's first series win since 2008. It also marked the first playoff series sweep in franchise history, and the first time that a team seeded sixth or lower had swept a First Round series since the NBA had expanded the First Round to a best-of-seven series. They advanced to the Conference Semifinals to face the second-seeded and defending champion and eventual NBA champion Golden State Warriors, the team that swept them in the First Round of the 2015 playoffs and were also champions that year. The Pelicans lost the series in five games and were eliminated from the playoffs.

Draft

Prior to the NBA draft, the Pelicans had only one second round pick, having traded their first round pick, rookie Buddy Hield, Tyreke Evans, Langston Galloway, and the Philadelphia 76ers' original second round pick to the Sacramento Kings in a blockbuster trade for star center DeMarcus Cousins and Omri Casspi. On June 21, 2017, however, the Pelicans acquired the Washington Wizards' second round pick (No. 52 overall) in exchange for guard Tim Frazier. As a result, the Pelicans entered draft night with two second round and no first round picks. On the night of the draft, the Pelicans traded away their second round pick (No. 40 overall) and cash considerations to the Charlotte Hornets in exchange for the Hornets' second round pick (No. 31 overall). With that pick, the Pelicans selected Duke point guard Frank Jackson. With the No. 52 overall pick, the Pelicans selected Xavier point guard Edmond Sumner and traded him to the Indiana Pacers for cash considerations.

Roster

Standings

Division

Conference

Game log

Preseason 

|- style="background:#fbb;"
| 1
| October 3
| Chicago
| 
| Anthony Davis (24)
| Cousins, Davis (10)
| Rajon Rondo (8)
| Smoothie King Center16,962
| 0–1
|- style="background:#fbb;"
| 2
| October 6
| @ Oklahoma City
| 
| Anthony Davis (14)
| Anthony Davis (7)
| Jrue Holiday (6)
| Chesapeake Energy ArenaN/A
| 0–2
|- style="background:#bfb;"
| 3
| October 8
| @ Chicago
| 
| Anthony Davis (37)
| Anthony Davis (15)
| DeMarcus Cousins (9)
| United Center17,523
| 1–2
|- style="background:#fbb;"
| 4
| October 13
| @ Memphis
| 
| Jordan Crawford (19)
| Cunningham, Diallo (6)
| Jordan Crawford (4)
| FedExForumN/A
| 1–3

Regular season 

|- style="background:#fcc;"
| 1
| October 18
| @ Memphis
| 
| Anthony Davis (33)
| Anthony Davis (18)
| Holiday, Moore (4)
| FedExForum17,794
| 0–1
|- style="background:#fcc;"
| 2
| October 20
| Golden State
| 
| Cousins, Davis (35)
| Anthony Davis (17)
| Jordan Crawford (7)
| Smoothie King Center18,171
| 0–2
|- style="background:#cfc;"
| 3
| October 22
| @ LA Lakers
| 
| Anthony Davis (27)
| Anthony Davis (17)
| DeMarcus Cousins (8)
| Staples Center18,997
| 1–2
|- style="background:#fcc;"
| 4
| October 24
| @ Portland
| 
| DeMarcus Cousins (39)
| DeMarcus Cousins (13)
| Jrue Holiday (7)
| Moda Center19,446
| 1–3
|- style="background:#cfc"
| 5
| October 26
| @ Sacramento
| 
| DeMarcus Cousins (41)
| DeMarcus Cousins (23)
| Jrue Holiday (6)
| Golden 1 Center17,583
| 2–3
|- style="background:#cfc;"
| 6
| October 28
| Cleveland
| 
| Anthony Davis (30)
| Anthony Davis (14)
| DeMarcus Cousins (10)
| Smoothie King Center18,539
| 3–3
|- style="background:#fcc;"
| 7
| October 30
| Orlando
| 
| Anthony Davis (30)
| DeMarcus Cousins (12)
| Jrue Holiday (8)
| Smoothie King Center14,004
| 3–4

|- style="background:#fcc;"
| 8
| November 1
| Minnesota
| 
| DeMarcus Cousins (35)
| Anthony Davis (10)
| Cousins, Davis, Holiday (6)
| Smoothie King Center14,788
| 3–5
|- style="background:#cfc;"
| 9
| November 3
| @ Dallas
| 
| Anthony Davis (30)
| DeMarcus Cousins (20)
| Jrue Holiday (8)
| American Airlines Center19,894
| 4–5
|- style="background:#cfc;"
| 10
| November 4
| @ Chicago
| 
| Anthony Davis (27)
| Anthony Davis (16)
| Jrue Holiday (6)
| United Center21,254
| 5–5
|- style="background:#cfc;"
| 11
| November 7
| @ Indiana
| 
| Anthony Davis (37)
| Anthony Davis (14)
| DeMarcus Cousins (6)
| Bankers Life Fieldhouse15,014
| 6–5
|- style="background:#fcc;"
| 12
| November 9
| @ Toronto
| 
| Jrue Holiday (34)
| DeMarcus Cousins (15)
| Jrue Holiday (11)
| Air Canada Centre19,800
| 6–6
|- style="background:#cfc;"
| 13
| November 11
| LA Clippers
| 
| DeMarcus Cousins (35)
| DeMarcus Cousins (15)
| Jrue Holiday (8)
| Smoothie King Center17,624
| 7–6
|- style="background:#cfc;"
| 14
| November 13
| Atlanta
| 
| E'Twaun Moore (24)
| DeMarcus Cousins (16)
| Cousins, Davis (7)
| Smoothie King Center14,631
| 8–6
|- style="background:#fcc;"
| 15
| November 15
| Toronto
| 
| DeMarcus Cousins (25)
| DeMarcus Cousins (9)
| Rajon Rondo (8)
| Smoothie King Center15,654
| 8–7
|- style="background:#fcc;"
| 16
| November 17
| @ Denver
| 
| Anthony Davis (17)
| DeMarcus Cousins (6)
| Jameer Nelson (9)
| Pepsi Center16,816
| 8–8
|- style="background:#cfc;"
| 17
| November 20
| Oklahoma City
| 
| Anthony Davis (36)
| Anthony Davis (15)
| Rajon Rondo (8)
| Smoothie King Center16,765
| 9–8
|- style="background:#cfc;"
| 18
| November 22
| San Antonio
| 
| Anthony Davis (29)
| DeMarcus Cousins (15)
| Davis, Rondo (4)
| Smoothie King Center17,539
| 10–8
|- style="background:#cfc;"
| 19
| November 24
| @ Phoenix
| 
| Anthony Davis (23)
| DeMarcus Cousins (10)
| Rajon Rondo (7)
| Talking Stick Resort Arena16,574
| 11–8
|- style="background:#fcc"
| 20
| November 25
| @ Golden State
| 
| Anthony Davis (30)
| Anthony Davis (15)
| Holiday, Rondo (6)
| Oracle Arena19,596
| 11–9
|- style="background:#fcc"
| 21
| November 29
| Minnesota
| 
| Jrue Holiday (27)
| DeMarcus Cousins (10)
| Rajon Rondo (7)
| Smoothie King Center15,555
| 11–10

|- style="background:#fcc"
| 22
| December 1
| @ Utah
| 
| DeMarcus Cousins (23)
| DeMarcus Cousins (13)
| Rajon Rondo (11)
| Vivint Smart Home Arena17,725
| 11–11
|- style="background:#cfc;"
| 23
| December 2
| @ Portland
| 
| DeMarcus Cousins (38)
| Dante Cunningham (12)
| Rajon Rondo (10)
| Moda Center18,730
| 12–11
|- style="background:#fcc"
| 24
| December 4
| Golden State
| 
| Jrue Holiday (34)
| DeMarcus Cousins (11)
| Rajon Rondo (11)
| Smoothie King Center17,004
| 12–12
|- style="background:#cfc;"
| 25
| December 6
| Denver
| 
| DeMarcus Cousins (40)
| DeMarcus Cousins (22)
| Holiday, Rondo (7)
| Smoothie King Center15,353
| 13–12
|- style="background:#fcc;"
| 26
| December 8
| Sacramento
| 
| DeMarcus Cousins (38)
| DeMarcus Cousins (11)
| Jrue Holiday (5)
| Smoothie King Center15,019
| 13–13
|- style="background:#cfc;"
| 27
| December 10
| Philadelphia
| 
| Jrue Holiday (34)
| DeMarcus Cousins (9)
| Rajon Rondo (18)
| Smoothie King Center16,878
| 14–13
|- style="background:#fcc;"
| 28
| December 11
| @ Houston
| 
| Jrue Holiday (37)
| DeMarcus Cousins (14)
| Rajon Rondo (12)
| Toyota Center18,055
| 14–14
|- style="background:#cfc;"
| 29
| December 13
| Milwaukee
| 
| DeMarcus Cousins (26)
| DeMarcus Cousins (13)
| Jrue Holiday (8)
| Smoothie King Center16,863
| 15–14
|- style="background:#fcc;"
| 30
| December 15
| @ Denver
| 
| DeMarcus Cousins (29)
| Anthony Davis (12)
| Jameer Nelson (7)
| Pepsi Center17,584
| 15–15
|- style="background:#fcc;"
| 31
| December 19
| @ Washington
| 
| Anthony Davis (37)
| DeMarcus Cousins (13)
| Jrue Holiday (5)
| Capital One Arena16,529
| 15–16
|- style="background:#cfc;"
| 32
| December 22
| @ Orlando
| 
| DeMarcus Cousins (26)
| Cousins, Davis (11)
| Rajon Rondo (8)
| Amway Center16,922
| 16–16
|- style="background:#cfc"
| 33
| December 23
| @ Miami
| 
| Ian Clark (19)
| DeMarcus Cousins (7)
| DeMarcus Cousins (8)
| AmericanAirlines Arena19,600
| 17–16
|- style="background:#cfc"
| 34
| December 27
| Brooklyn
| 
| Anthony Davis (33)
| DeMarcus Cousins (14)
| Rajon Rondo (25)
| Smoothie King Center16,707
| 18–16
|- style="background:#fcc"
| 35
| December 29
| Dallas
| 
| Anthony Davis (33)
| DeMarcus Cousins (20)
| Cousins, Rondo (8)
| Smoothie King Center16,878 
| 18–17
|- style="background:#fcc"
| 36
| December 30
| New York
| 
| Anthony Davis (31)
| DeMarcus Cousins (19)
| Rajon Rondo (12)
| Smoothie King Center16,947
| 18–18

|- style="background:#cfc"
| 37
| January 3
| @ Utah
| 
| Anthony Davis (29)
| Anthony Davis (15)
| Holiday, Moore (5)
| Vivint Smart Home Arena18,306
| 19–18
|- style="background:#fcc"
| 38
| January 6
| @ Minnesota
| 
| DeMarcus Cousins (23)
| DeMarcus Cousins (15)
| DeMarcus Cousins (5)
| Target Center18,978
| 19–19
|- style="background:#cfc"
| 39
| January 8
| Detroit
| 
| Anthony Davis (30)
| Cousins, Davis (10)
| Rajon Rondo (15)
| Smoothie King Center12,874
| 20–19
|- style="background:#fcc"
| 40
| January 10
| @ Memphis
| 
| DeMarcus Cousins (29)
| DeMarcus Cousins (8)
| Jrue Holiday (6)
| FedExForum14,312
| 20–20
|- style="background:#cfc"
| 41
| January 12
| Portland
| 
| Anthony Davis (36)
| DeMarcus Cousins (19)
| DeMarcus Cousins (8)
| Smoothie King Center17,003
| 21–20
|- style="background:#cfc"
| 42
| January 14
| @ New York
| 
| Anthony Davis (48)
| Anthony Davis (17)
| Cousins, Rondo (5)
| Madison Square Garden19,812
| 22–20
|- style="background:#cfc"
| 43
| January 16
| @ Boston
| 
| Anthony Davis (45)
| Anthony Davis (16)
| Rajon Rondo (8)
| TD Garden18,624
| 23–20
|- style="background:#fcc"
| 44
| January 17
| @ Atlanta
| 
| Jrue Holiday (22)
| DeMarcus Cousins (14)
| DeMarcus Cousins (7)
| Philips Arena10,894
| 23–21
|- style="background:#cfc"
| 45
| January 20
| Memphis
| 
| Jrue Holiday (27)
| Anthony Davis (12)
| Jrue Holiday (8)
| Smoothie King Center18,212
| 24–21
|- style="background:#cfc"
| 46
| January 22
| Chicago
| 
| DeMarcus Cousins (44)
| DeMarcus Cousins (24)
| DeMarcus Cousins (10)
| Smoothie King Center17,101
| 25–21
|- style="background:#cfc"
| 47
| January 24
| @ Charlotte
| 
| Davis, Holiday (19)
| DeMarcus Cousins (13)
| Cousins, Rondo (5)
| Spectrum Center14,588
| 26–21
|- style="background:#cfc"
| 48
| January 26
| Houston
| 
| Anthony Davis (27)
| DeMarcus Cousins (13)
| DeMarcus Cousins (11)
| Smoothie King Center17,186
| 27–21
|- style="background:#fcc"
| 49
| January 28
| LA Clippers
| 
| Anthony Davis (25)
| Anthony Davis (17)
| Jrue Holiday (7)
| Smoothie King Center16,378
| 27–22
|- style="background:#fcc"
| 50
| January 30
| Sacramento
| 
| Anthony Davis (23)
| Anthony Davis (13)
| Jameer Nelson (8)
| Smoothie King Center14,292
| 27–23

|- style="background:#cfc"
| 51
| February 2
| @ Oklahoma City 
| 
| Anthony Davis (43)
| Anthony Davis (10)
| Rajon Rondo (13)
| Chesapeake Energy Arena18,203
| 28–23
|- style="background:#fcc"
| 52
| February 3
| @ Minnesota
| 
| Anthony Davis (38)
| Nikola Mirotic (12)
| Jrue Holiday (9)
| Target Center17,954
| 28–24
|- style="background:#fcc;"
| 53
| February 5
| Utah
| 
| Jrue Holiday (28)
| Anthony Davis (11)
| Rajon Rondo (8)
| Smoothie King Center14,293
| 28–25
|- style="background:#bbb;"
| —
| February 7
| Indiana
| colspan="4" |Postponed due to water leak in arena roof (March 21)
| Smoothie King Center
| 
|- style="background:#fcc;"
| 54
| February 9
| @ Philadelphia
| 
| Ian Clark (15)
| Davis, Okafor (8)
| Rajon Rondo (9)
| Wells Fargo Center20,489
| 28–26
|- style="background:#cfc;"
| 55
| February 10
| @ Brooklyn
| 
| Anthony Davis (44)
| Anthony Davis (17)
| Rajon Rondo (12)
| Barclays Center16,572
| 29–26
|- style="background:#cfc;"
| 56
| February 12
| @ Detroit
| 
| Anthony Davis (38)
| Anthony Davis (10)
| Jrue Holiday (12)
| Little Caesars Arena14,453
| 30–26
|- style="background:#cfc;"
| 57
| February 14
| LA Lakers
| 
| Anthony Davis (42)
| Anthony Davis (15)
| Jrue Holiday (11)
| Smoothie King Center15,436
| 31–26
|- style="text-align:center;"
| colspan="9" style="background:#bbcaff;"|All-Star Break
|- style="background:#cfc;"
| 58
| February 23
| Miami
| 
| Anthony Davis (45)
| Anthony Davis (17)
| Jrue Holiday (9)
| Smoothie King Center17,751
| 32–26
|- style="background:#cfc;"
| 59
| February 25
| @ Milwaukee
| 
| Jrue Holiday (36)
| Anthony Davis (13)
| Rajon Rondo (12)
| Bradley Center18,717
| 33–26
|- style="background:#cfc;"
| 60
| February 26
| Phoenix
| 
| Anthony Davis (53)
| Anthony Davis (18)
| Rajon Rondo (12)
| Smoothie King Center14,302
| 34–26
|- style="background:#cfc;"
| 61
| February 28
| @ San Antonio
| 
| Anthony Davis (26)
| Anthony Davis (15)
| Rajon Rondo (12)
| AT&T Center18,418
| 35–26

|- style="background:#cfc;"
| 62
| March 4
| @ Dallas
| 
| Jrue Holiday (30)
| Cheick Diallo (15)
| Rajon Rondo (10)
| American Airlines Center19,798
| 36–26
|- style="background:#cfc;"
| 63
| March 6
| @ LA Clippers
| 
| Anthony Davis (41)
| Anthony Davis (13)
| Jrue Holiday (17)
| Staples Center16,412
| 37–26
|- style="background:#cfc;"
| 64
| March 7
| @ Sacramento
| 
| Jrue Holiday (23)
| Nikola Mirotic (10)
| Jrue Holiday (8)
| Golden 1 Center17,583
| 38–26
|- style="background:#fcc;"
| 65
| March 9
| Washington
| 
| Darius Miller (20)
| Nikola Mirotic (12)
| DeAndre Liggins (5)
| Smoothie King Center18,143
| 38–27
|- style="background:#fcc;"
| 66
| March 11
| Utah
| 
| Anthony Davis (25)
| Anthony Davis (11)
| Jrue Holiday (10)
| Smoothie King Center18,062
| 38–28
|- style="background:#cfc;"
| 67
| March 13
| Charlotte
| 
| Anthony Davis (31)
| Anthony Davis (14)
| Rajon Rondo (17)
| Smoothie King Center15,507
| 39–28
|- style="background:#fcc;"
| 68
| March 15
| @ San Antonio
| 
| Jrue Holiday (24)
| Anthony Davis (14)
| Jrue Holiday (7)
| AT&T Center18,418
| 39–29
|- style="background:#fcc;"
| 69
| March 17
| Houston
| 
| Anthony Davis (26)
| Anthony Davis (13)
| Jrue Holiday (8)
| Smoothie King Center18,495
| 39–30
|- style="background:#cfc;"
| 70
| March 18
| Boston
| 
| Anthony Davis (34)
| Anthony Davis (11)
| Rajon Rondo (11)
| Smoothie King Center18,277
| 40–30
|- style="background:#cfc;"
| 71
| March 20
| Dallas
| 
| Anthony Davis (37)
| Cheick Diallo (14)
| Rajon Rondo (14)
| Smoothie King Center14,484
| 41–30
|- style="background:#cfc;"
| 72
| March 21
| Indiana
| 
| Anthony Davis (28)
| Anthony Davis (13)
| Rajon Rondo (6)
| Smoothie King Center14,148
| 42–30
|- style="background:#cfc;"
| 73
| March 22
| LA Lakers
| 
| Anthony Davis (33)
| Anthony Davis (9)
| Rajon Rondo (10)
| Smoothie King Center18,037
| 43–30
|- style="background:#fcc;"
| 74
| March 24
| @ Houston
| 
| Anthony Davis (25)
| Cheick Diallo (9)
| Jrue Holiday (4)
| Toyota Center18,055
| 43–31
|- style="background:#fcc;"
| 75
| March 27
| Portland
| 
| Anthony Davis (36)
| Anthony Davis (14)
| Jrue Holiday (11)
| Smoothie King Center15,426
| 43–32
|- style="background:#fcc;"
| 76
| March 30
| @ Cleveland
| 
| Jrue Holiday (25)
| Anthony Davis (8)
| Rajon Rondo (8)
| Quicken Loans Arena20,562
| 43–33

|- style="background:#fcc;"
| 77
| April 1
| Oklahoma City
| 
| Anthony Davis (25)
| Anthony Davis (11)
| Rajon Rondo (9)
| Smoothie King Center18,500
| 43–34
|- style="background:#cfc;"
| 78
| April 4
| Memphis
| 
| Anthony Davis (28)
| Anthony Davis (12)
| Rajon Rondo (13)
| Smoothie King Center16,521
| 44–34
|- style="background:#cfc;"
| 79
| April 6
| @ Phoenix
| 
| Anthony Davis (33)
| Nikola Mirotic (16)
| Jrue Holiday (10)
| Talking Stick Resort Arena18,055
| 45–34
|- style="background:#cfc;"
| 80
| April 7
| @ Golden State
| 
| Anthony Davis (34)
| Anthony Davis (12)
| Rajon Rondo (17)
| Oracle Arena19,596
| 46–34
|- style="background:#cfc;"
| 81
| April 9
| @ LA Clippers
| 
| Anthony Davis (28)
| Nikola Mirotic (16)
| Jrue Holiday (10)
| Staples Center15,742
| 47–34
|- style="background:#cfc;"
| 82
| April 11
| San Antonio
| 
| Jrue Holiday (23)
| Davis, Mirotić (15)
| Rajon Rondo (14)
| Smoothie King Center18,573
| 48–34

Playoffs

|- style="background:#cfc;"
| 1
| April 14
| @ Portland
| 
| Anthony Davis (35)
| Anthony Davis (14)
| Rajon Rondo (17)
| Moda Center19,882
| 1–0
|- style="background:#cfc;"
| 2
| April 17
| @ Portland
| 
| Jrue Holiday (33)
| Anthony Davis (13)
| Holiday, Rondo (9)
| Moda Center20,066
| 2–0
|- style="background:#cfc;"
| 3
| April 19
| Portland
| 
| Nikola Mirotic (30)
| Anthony Davis (11)
| Rajon Rondo (11)
| Smoothie King Center18,551
| 3–0
|- style="background:#cfc;"
| 4
| April 21
| Portland
| 
| Anthony Davis (47)
| Davis, Mirotic (11)
| Rajon Rondo (16)
| Smoothie King Center18,544
| 4–0

|- style="background:#fcc;"
| 1
| April 28
| @ Golden State
| 
| Anthony Davis (21)
| Anthony Davis (10)
| Rajon Rondo (11)
| Oracle Arena19,596
| 0–1
|- style="background:#fcc;"
| 2
| May 1
| @ Golden State
| 
| Anthony Davis (25)
| Anthony Davis (14)
| Rajon Rondo (10)
| Oracle Arena19,596
| 0–2
|- style="background:#cfc;"
| 3
| May 4
| Golden State
| 
| Anthony Davis (33)
| Anthony Davis (18)
| Rajon Rondo (21)
| Smoothie King Center18,551
| 1–2
|- style="background:#fcc;"
| 4
| May 6
| Golden State
| 
| Anthony Davis (26)
| Anthony Davis (12)
| Rajon Rondo (6)
| Smoothie King Center18,513
| 1–3
|- style="background:#fcc;"
| 5
| May 8
| @ Golden State
| 
| Anthony Davis (34)
| Anthony Davis (19)
| Jrue Holiday (11)
| Oracle Arena19,596
| 1–4

Player statistics

Regular season 

|-
| align="left"|† || align="center"| SF
| 22 || 0 || 273 || 47 || 9 || 11 || 3 || 103
|-
| align="left"|† || align="center"| C
| 14 || 0 || 121 || 37 || 2 || 1 || 2 || 18
|-
| align="left"| || align="center"| SG
| 13 || 0 || 38 || 2 || 1 || 1 || 0 || 6
|-
| align="left"| || align="center"| SG
| 74 || 2 || 1,455 || 127 || 110 || 33 || 10 || 551
|-
| align="left"| || align="center"| C
| 48 || 48 || 1,737 || 617 || 257 || 79 || 76 || 1,210
|-
| align="left"| || align="center"| PG
| 5 || 0 || 53 || 4 || 13 || 1 || 1 || 33
|-
| align="left"| || align="center"| SF
| 51 || 24 || 1,115 || 193 || 26 || 27 || 16 || 253
|-
| align="left"| || align="center"| PF
| 75 || 75 || 2,727 ||style=";"|832 || 174 || 115 || style=";"|193 || style=";"|2,110
|-
| align="left"| || align="center"| PF
| 52 || 0 || 581 || 211 || 19 || 11 || 21 || 254
|-
| align="left"| || align="center"| PG
| 7 || 0 || 55 || 2 || 8 || 0 || 0 || 15
|-
| align="left"| || align="center"| SF
| 12 || 1 || 187 || 36 || 22 || 7 || 1 || 29
|-
| align="left"| || align="center"| SG
| 81 || style=";"|81 ||style=";"| 2,927 || 365 || 486 ||style=";"| 123 || 64 || 1,537
|-
| align="left"|‡ || align="center"| PG
| 4 || 0 || 18 || 1 || 6 || 1 || 0 || 4
|-
| align="left"|‡ || align="center"| SF
| 4 || 0 || 19 || 3 || 0 || 0 || 0 || 5
|-
| align="left"|≠ || align="center"| PG
| 5 || 0 || 35 || 2 || 5 || 0 || 1 || 17
|-
| align="left"| || align="center"| PG
| 27 || 3 || 244 || 26 || 21 || 10 || 4 || 44
|-
| align="left"| || align="center"| SF
| style=";"|82 || 3 || 1,944 || 164 || 111 || 28 || 17 || 637
|-
| align="left"|≠ || align="center"| PF
| 30 || 11 || 872 || 246 || 41 || 29 || 26 || 439
|-
| align="left"| || align="center"| SG
| style=";"|82 || 80 || 2,586 || 238 || 187 || 79 || 12 || 1,022
|-
| align="left"|† || align="center"| PG
| 43 || 0 || 897 || 96 || 156 || 79 || 76 || 221
|-
| align="left"|≠ || align="center"| C
| 26 || 19 || 353 || 120 || 8 || 8 || 25 || 221
|-
| align="left"| || align="center"| PG
| 65 || 63 || 1,703 || 263 || style=";"|533 || 70 || 10 || 537
|-
| align="left"| || align="center"| PF
| 3 || 0 || 12 || 4 || 0 || 0 || 0 || 2
|}
After all games.
‡Waived during the season
†Traded during the season
≠Acquired during the season

Transactions

Trades

Free agency

Re-signed

Additions

Subtractions

Awards, records and milestones

Awards

Records

Season

 Anthony Davis set franchise records in:
 Most blocks in a game
 10 in a loss against the Utah Jazz on March 11, 2018
 Most blocks in a half
 6 – tied his own franchise mark on the same day.
 Field goals in a season (780)
 Points in a season (2,110)
 Points per game (28.1)
 DeMarcus Cousins set a franchise record in:
 Defensive rebound percentage in a season (30.9%)
 Rajon Rondo set franchise records in:
 Most assists in a game
 25 in a win against the Brooklyn Nets on December 27, 2017.
 Most assists in a quarter
 9 in a win against the Detroit Pistons on January 8, 2018, tying a franchise record.

Playoffs

 Anthony Davis set a franchise record in:
 Most points in a playoff game
 47 in Game 4 against the Portland Trail Blazers.
 Rajon Rondo tied a franchise record in:
 Most assists in a playoff game
 17 in Game 1 against the Portland Trail Blazers. Tied the record with Chris Paul.

Milestones

 On November 22, 2017, Anthony Davis reached 7,938 career points, moving him to second in points scored in franchise history after passing Chris Paul.
 On January 18, 2018, both Davis and DeMarcus Cousins were selected as NBA All-Star starters, which marked the first time since 2009 that multiple New Orleans players have been selected to the All-Star game. It was also the first time in franchise history that multiple players have started the All-Star game.
 On January 28, 2018, Davis reached 3,857 career rebounds, giving him the all-time franchise high in rebounds after passing David West.
 On February 2, 2018, Davis passed David West in points scored, giving him the all-time franchise high with 8,702.
 The Pelicans finished second in the Southwest Division, which was the highest since the 2007–08 season.
 The Pelicans finished first in the league in:
 Total minutes played in a season (19,995)
 Minutes played per game (243.4)

Playoffs
 The Pelicans clinched their first playoff berth since 2015.
 On April 14, 2018, the Pelicans won the first game in the First Round playoff series which marked the franchise's first playoff game win since the 2011 NBA playoffs.
 On April 21, 2018, the Pelicans completed the playoff series sweep over the Portland Trail Blazers, marking the franchise's first series win since 2008. It was also the first playoff series sweep in franchise history, and the first time that a team seeded sixth or lower had swept a First Round series since the NBA had expanded the First Round to a best-of-seven series.

References

New Orleans Pelicans seasons
New Orleans Pelicans
New Orleans Pelicans
New Orleans Pelicans